In science, absorptivity may refer to:

Molar absorptivity, in chemistry, a measurement of how strongly a chemical species absorbs light at a given wavelength
Absorptance, in physics, the fraction of radiation absorbed at a given wavelength
Emissivity#Absorptivity, information on the radiometrical aspect